The following is a list of prime ministers of the Netherlands since the inception of that office as a result of a revision of the Constitution of the Netherlands in 1848. The prime minister is the chairman of the Council of Ministers; since 1945 he has held the Dutch title of minister-president van Nederland, also referred to as premier.

Mark Rutte is currently serving as the 42nd and current prime minister of the Netherlands, having been appointed to the office for the first time on 14 October 2010.

List of prime ministers (1848−present)
Political parties:

Christian democratic

Liberal

Social democratic

Graphical timeline

See also
 Historical rankings of prime ministers of the Netherlands
 List of prime ministers of the Netherlands by education
 Religious affiliations of prime ministers of the Netherlands

Prime Minister
Netherlands